Robert C. Drummond (born June 21, 1967, in Apopka, Florida) is an American former gridiron football running back. He played for the Philadelphia Eagles of the National Football League between 1989 and 1991 before playing in the Canadian Football League from 1994 to 2002. Drummond won four Grey Cups in 1995, 1996, 1997, and 2000.

References

External links
Just Sports Stats

1967 births
Living people
African-American players of American football
African-American players of Canadian football
American football running backs
Baltimore Stallions players
BC Lions players
Canadian football running backs
Philadelphia Eagles players
Toronto Argonauts players
Syracuse Orange football players
Players of American football from Syracuse, New York
21st-century African-American people
20th-century African-American sportspeople